The Wild Life is a 1984 American coming-of-age comedy-drama film directed by Art Linson and written by Cameron Crowe. The film stars Chris Penn, Lea Thompson, Ilan Mitchell-Smith, Jenny Wright, Eric Stoltz, Rick Moranis, Hart Bochner, and Randy Quaid.

The Wild Life was theatrically released in the United States on September 28, 1984, by Universal Pictures. While the film is not a direct sequel to Fast Times at Ridgemont High (1982), it was seen by many as a spiritual sequel due to Crowe's involvement in both and the films' shared universe/style of being R-rated comedy/dramas set amongst young people finding their way in Southern California.

Plot summary
The plot concerns three teenagers living in the suburbs of Los Angeles. Bill has just graduated from high school and got his first apartment. His younger brother Jim, who is fixated on Vietnam and the Vietnam war, spends a lot of time practicing with his Nunchakus, getting high, listening to heavy metal on his boombox, and hanging out with Vietnam vet Charlie. Other important characters include Tom, a hedonistic high-school wrestling champ who works with Bill at a bowling alley; Harry, a trendy department store manager; Anita, Bill's ex-girlfriend who works at a donut shop; and Eileen, Anita's friend and Tommy's girlfriend who works at the department store with Harry. Anita has a fling with a cop named David, who, unknown to Anita, is married. The three boys set out for a night of fun and craziness at a strip bar and later on have a party at Bill's apartment.

Cast

Soundtrack

"The Wild Life" is a song written and performed by English female pop music vocal group Bananarama. It was composed for and included in the movie and on its soundtrack. The single peaked at number 70 on the Billboard Hot 100 in December 1984.

Edward Van Halen wrote and performed the score for the film, but was unable to finish mixing due to Van Halen's touring schedule, and left that task to the band's long-term engineer Donn Landee. The instrumental "Donut City" was the only original Edward Van Halen composition appearing on the official soundtrack album.

The film's soundtrack included music by the likes of Prince, Madonna, Andy Summers, Little Richard, Van Halen, Billy Idol, Steppenwolf, and Jimi Hendrix. Music licensing fees have prevented The Wild Life from receiving an uncut release on DVD. Universal formerly offered a made-to-order disc in its Vault series, with many of the songs removed.

When Universal created the alternate soundtrack for VHS/Laserdisc/TV broadcast, they also revised the end credits and removed the songs that were replaced on the soundtrack. Universal's "Vault Series" DVD-R did not use these revised end credits even though it used the alternate soundtrack.

More recently, the HD broadcast version has all of the songs intact.

See also
 List of American films of 1984

References

External links
 
 
 
 
 
 

1980s English-language films
1984 films
1980s buddy comedy-drama films
1980s teen comedy-drama films
American teen comedy-drama films
American buddy comedy-drama films
Films directed by Art Linson
Films produced by Cameron Crowe
Films produced by Art Linson
Films set in Los Angeles
Films shot in California
Films shot in Los Angeles
Films with screenplays by Cameron Crowe
Universal Pictures films
Teen sex comedy films
1980s American films